Jagdam Collegeis an education institution in the Indian city of Chhapra in the state of Bihar, India. Founded in 1954 the college is Constituent Colleges of Jai Prakash University, Chhapra. It is situated beside the jila school chapra.

History
The college was earlier affiliated to Bihar University, Muzaffarpur. But after establishment of Jai Prakash University in Chhapra. The affiliation of College was transferred to Jai Prakash University in 1990.

Departments
 Faculty of Sciences
 Faculty of Humanities and Social Sciences
 Faculty of Commerce

External links
 Jagdam College College Chhapra website
 Jai Prakash University Chhapra website

References

Saran district
Constituent colleges of Jai Prakash University
Colleges in India
1954 establishments in Bihar
Educational institutions established in 1954